Conchita Martínez and Patricia Tarabini were the defending champions, but decided to compete this year with different partners.

Martínez, alongside her partner Jelena Dokic, decided to withdraw in order to focus on the singles competition.

Tarabini teamed up with Laura Montalvo and lost in first round to Elena Likhovtseva and Nicole Pratt.

Daniela Hantuchová and Arantxa Sánchez Vicario won the title by defeating María Emilia Salerni and Åsa Svensson 6–4, 6–2 in the final.

Seeds

Draw

Draw

References
 Official Results Archive (ITF)
 Official Results Archive (WTA)

Bausch and Lomb Championships - Doubles
Doubles